George Washington (1732–1799) was the president of the United States from 1789 to 1797.

George Washington may also refer to:

People
 George Washington (name), several people bearing the name

Ships

U.S. Navy vessels

 , a sloop
 , an ocean liner taken over and used as a transport ship in World War I and World War II
 , the lead ship of the George Washington submarine class
 , a Nimitz class nuclear-powered supercarrier

Other ships
 , a German ocean liner

Bridges
 George Washington Bridge, a suspension bridge connecting New York City to Fort Lee, New Jersey
 George Washington Memorial Bridge (commonly called the Aurora Bridge) in Seattle, Washington

Film and television
 George Washington (film), a 2000 drama
 George Washington (miniseries), a 1984 television miniseries

Hotels
 George Washington Hotel (New York City), a defunct hotel and boarding house in Manhattan, New York
 Hotel George Washington (Jacksonville), a luxury hotel in operation from 1926 to 1971

Monuments

 Equestrian statue of George Washington (New York City), an 1865 bronze equestrian statue in Union Square, Manhattan
 George Washington (Bailly), an 1869 statue at Independence Hall, Philadelphia
 George Washington (Canova), an 1820 marble statue by Antonio Canova
 George Washington (Ceracchi), a 1795 marble bust by Giuseppe Ceracchi
 George Washington (Fairbanks), a 1975 outdoor bronze sculpture at George Washington University, Washington, D.C.
 George Washington (Greenough), an 1840 statue by Horatio Greenough
 George Washington (Houdon), a 1788-1791/1792 life-size statue by Jean-Antoine Houdon in Richmond, Virginia
 George Washington (copy of bust by Houdon), a 1932 public artwork in Indianapolis, Indiana
 Lieutenant General George Washington (statue), an 1860 equestrian statue by Clark Mills
 Statue of George Washington (Austin, Texas), a 1955 sculpture installed at the University of Texas at Austin
 Statue of George Washington (Indianapolis), a 1959 artwork in Indianapolis, Indiana
 Statue of George Washington (Portland, Oregon), a 1927 sculpture installed in Portland, Oregon
 Statue of George Washington (Seattle), a 1909 bronze sculpture at the University of Washington, Seattle
 Statue of George Washington (Wall Street), an 1883 bronze sculpture on Wall Street, New York City
 Washington Monument (Milwaukee), an 1883 bronze sculpture in Milwaukee, Wisconsin

Other uses

 George, Washington, a United States city
 George Washington (book), a children's book by Genevieve Foster
 George Washington (horse), a racehorse
 George Washington (train), a named train of the Chesapeake and Ohio Railway
 George Washington (Trumbull), a 1780 portrait by John Trumbull
 George Washington (John Trumbull, 1790)
 George Washington Colonials, the athletic program of George Washington University
 George Washington School (disambiguation)
 George Washington High School (disambiguation)
 George Washington Memorial Parkway, an American parkway in Virginia and Maryland
 George Washington University, a private university in Washington, D.C.
 United States one-dollar bill, which features a portrait of George Washington

See also
 
 
 Washington (disambiguation)
 George (disambiguation)